Ostrovu may refer to several villages in Romania:

 Ostrovu, a village in Valea Argovei Commune, Călăraşi County
 Ostrovu, a village in Aluniş Commune, Prahova County